North Carolina's 48th House district is one of 120 districts in the North Carolina House of Representatives. It has been represented by Democrat Garland Pierce since 2005.

Geography
Since 2019, the district has included all of Hoke and Scotland counties. The district overlaps with the 24th Senate district.

District officeholders

Multi-member district

Single-member district

Election results

2022

2020

2018

2016

2014

2012

2010

2008

2006

2004

2002

2000

References

North Carolina House districts
Hoke County, North Carolina
Scotland County, North Carolina